A resto is a rest area.

Resto may also refer to:
Luis Resto (disambiguation)
Resto Cal lookers, modified Volkswagen Beetles